Harji Ram Burdak (15 July 1931 – 20 December 2013) was an Indian National Congress politician from Nagaur district in Rajasthan, and Agriculture Minister.

References

External links
Elections in Ladnu
Election analysis

1931 births
Rajasthani people
2013 deaths
People from Nagaur district
State cabinet ministers of Rajasthan